Flornes Station was a railway station on the Meråker Line in the village of Flornes in the municipality of Stjørdal in Trøndelag county, Norway. The station was opened on 17 October 1881 as Floren. It changed name to Flora in April 1921, and to the current on 11 September 1934. It has been unmanned since 1 March 1971 and on 13 June 1993, the station was closed.

References

Railway stations in Stjørdal
Railway stations on the Meråker Line
Railway stations opened in 1881
Disused railway stations in Norway
1881 establishments in Norway
1993 disestablishments in Norway